Coprinellus verrucispermus is a species of fungus in the family Psathyrellaceae. The fungus has been identified in a study of soils from the northern-central region of New South Wales, Australia. Formerly in the genus Coprinus, it was given its current name in 2001.

References

verrucispermus
Fungi described in 1988
Fungi of Australia